Jacob's Pillow is a dance centre, school and performance space located in Becket, Massachusetts, in the Berkshires. The organization is known for a Summer dance festival. The facility also includes a professional school and extensive archives as well as year-round community programs. The facility itself was listed as a National Historic Landmark District in 2003.

History
The site of Jacob's Pillow in Becket, Massachusetts was originally settled in 1790 by Jacob Carter III. Because of the zigzagging road leading to the hilltop property, it became known as "Jacob's Ladder", after the Biblical story, and a pillow-shaped rock on the property prompted the farm to acquire the name "Jacob's Pillow".

The farm was purchased in 1931 by modern dance pioneer Ted Shawn as a dance retreat.  Shawn and his wife, Ruth St. Denis, led the highly regarded Denishawn Company, which had popularized dance forms rooted in theater and cultural traditions outside European ballet.  They were influential in training a host of dance pioneers, including Martha Graham, Charles Weidman, Doris Humphrey, and Jack Cole.

Shawn's objective was to establish a dance organization for American men.  The early corps of his all-male company built many of the structures on the Jacob's Pillow campus.  This effort came to an end in 1940 with the advent of the Second World War; Shawn's company disbanded and most of its members joined the military.

Significant debt forced Shawn to consider sale of the property.  In 1940, he leased the property to dance teacher Mary Washington Ball, but her summer festival was also financially unsuccessful.  British ballet stars Alicia Markova and Anton Dolin learned of Shawn's financial difficulties, and decided to acquire the property.  With financial backing and fundraising support from millionaire Reginald Wright, $50,000 was raised to purchase the property and construct a theatre building.  The summer dance festival was revived, and Shawn was retained as its director until his death in 1972.

In 2003, the Jacob's Pillow property was declared a National Historic Landmark District by the federal government as "an exceptional cultural venue that holds value for all Americans." It is the only dance entity in the U.S. to receive this honor. In March 2011, Jacob's Pillow was named a recipient of the 2010 National Medal of Arts, a national award of distinction.

The Doris Duke Theatre, one of two indoor performance spaces, was destroyed in a fire on November 17, 2020.

Festival
The Pillow presents international dance in many forms, styles, and traditions, and approximately 200 events each season, including performances, lectures, tours, films, exhibits, and talks with artists from all over the world, culminating in approximately 80,000 visitors annually.

Pillow founder Ted Shawn was instrumental in beginning the careers of Martha Graham and Jack Cole, and the Pillow has continued this mentoring role in the careers of artists such as Alvin Ailey, José Limón, and Mark Morris. Companies such as Dance Theatre of Harlem, the Parsons Dance Company, and Trey McIntyre Project made their debuts at the Pillow, and international groups such as The Royal Danish Ballet, Nederlands Dans Theatre, Black Grace and Hofesh Shechter Company have made their U.S. debuts here. World premieres have been commissioned from choreographers such as Merce Cunningham and Paul Taylor, and artists such as Margot Fonteyn and Mikhail Baryshnikov have been showcased in works.

Performances at Jacob's Pillow take place in two venues. The Ted Shawn Theatre went through a renovation which was completed in 2022 and included a new ventilation and air cooling system, creation of an orchestra pit, enhanced accessibility for artists backstage and audience seating, increased stage depth, new industry standard electrical system, expanded clearance height to 25 feet, a new indoor artist crossover, and a new lower level with flexible dressing rooms, wardrobe spaces, an elevator and accessible ramp system, and a maintenance space. The Ted Shawn Theatre has a capacity of 620 reserved seats. Talks by Pillow Scholars-in-Residence take place before every performance, and Post-Show Talks happen in the Ted Shawn Theatre on Thursdays, giving audiences an opportunity to engage with artists in moderated Q&A sessions.

The second venue is the outdoor Henry J. Leir Stage, which presents the Inside/Out Performance Series, free performances of established and emerging artists from all over the world in an informal, outdoor venue set against a panoramic vista of the Berkshire hills. Wednesdays, Thursdays and Fridays feature emerging artists, and Saturdays showcase the dancers of The School at Jacob's Pillow. Each performance in the Inside/Out Series concludes with a Q&A session with the artists. Artist featured in Inside/Out include: Pilobolus Dance Theater, Nadine Bommer Dance Company, Reggie "Regg Roc" Gray, Michelle Dorrance with Dormeshia Sumbry-Edwards, Dušan Týnek Dance Theatre, Abarukas, Manuel Vignoulle, and Laurie M. Taylor.

Doris Duke Studio Theatre 
The Doris Duke Theatre, built in 1990 as one of three primary performance spaces on Jacob’s Pillow’s 220-acre campus in Western Massachusetts, was lost to a structure fire the morning of November 17, 2020 beginning around 5am EST. The fire was contained to the building; no one was injured and no other buildings suffered damage. Firefighters from Becket Fire Department and surrounding towns responded to the call from an eyewitness just before 7am and arrived on the scene shortly thereafter. 

The origin and cause of the fire at Jacob’s Pillow’s Doris Duke Theatre on November 17, 2020 was ruled undetermined by the Massachusetts State Police Fire Investigation led by Officer Daniel B. Quigley. Catastrophic damage of the site resulted in limited scene examination. The report, delivered to Jacob’s Pillow on February 12, indicated that the fire is believed to have originated in the southeast corner of the building where a vast amount of the building’s theatrical electrical equipment was located, including professional lighting and audio systems. 

The Massachusetts State Police Fire Investigation concluded that the theatre's sprinkler suppression system was inoperable or limited in its capabilities at the time of the fire and that a malfunction in the pump system failed to properly supply water to the sprinkler system and nearby hydrant. These issues slowed fire suppression efforts. There was no evidence of an incendiary act. Pending any new information, the case is considered closed.

Immediately following the incident, Jacob’s Pillow initiated an internal site-wide safety audit, confirming reliability of all alarm and fire suppression systems and to better understand any further weakness to the safety and security of every building on its campus. In addition, the Pillow has engaged an outside risk management professional to further identify potential problems and has released a request for proposal (RFP) for an upgrade to its current fire-pump system.

In the aftermath of the fire, Jacob’s Pillow received a tremendous outpouring of support from artists and audiences around the world. The Pillow was able to commit to move several of its on-site, COVID-compliant residences for dance companies that had been scheduled in the theatre between December through May into The Perles Family Studio, the other year-round rehearsal space on campus. Jacob’s Pillow is at the early stages of planning to rebuild the Doris Duke Theatre and has hired an external consultant to conduct interviews with artists, technicians, and audiences members as initial research.  

“Our hope is to build a theatre that has all of the warmth and character of the Doris Duke Theatre while providing for the needs of artists and audiences in the 21st century,” says Executive & Artistic Director Pamela Tatge.

The School at Jacob's Pillow

The School at Jacob's Pillow is based out of the Perles Family Studio and is a conservatory-style curriculum of five programs: Ballet, Contemporary Traditions, Cultural Traditions, Tap/Musical Theatre, and the Ann & Weston Hicks Choreography Fellows Program. The dancers’ schedule includes six days each week with four professional-level studio classes each day, coaching sessions, weekly performances for the public, master classes with Festival artists, talks led by Scholars-in-Residence, study assignments in the Pillow's Archives, and attendance at all Festival performances and events.

The School at Jacob's Pillow is known for its faculty. Faculty of The School at Jacob's Pillow have included Susan Jaffe, Amanda McKerrow, Chet Walker, Nikolaj Hubbe, Anna-Marie Holmes, Milton Myers, Katherine Dunham, Rennie Harris, Matt Mattox, Soledad Barrio, Tim Rushton, Finis Jhung, Martin Santangelo, Mercedes Ellington, Stephanie Saland, Victor Plotnikov, Annie-B Parson, Paul Lazar, Aszure Barton, Helen Pickett, Banu Ogan, Mr. Wiggles, Marjory Smarth, Dana Moore, and Ric Ryder.

Alumni of The School include MacArthur Grant-winner Meredith Monk, choreographer Mia Michaels, former Alvin Ailey Dance Theater and Paul Taylor Dance Company principal Linda Kent, artistic director of the Royal Danish Ballet Nikolaj Hübbe, recent winner of FOX's television show So You Think You Can Dance, Joshua Allen, and Robert Swinston of Merce Cunningham Dance Company.

Archives
The core collections preserved in the archives at Jacob's Pillow were originally assembled by founder Ted Shawn. Materials have been continually added since the 1930s by volunteers from the Pillow Board and staff. In 1991, Jacob's Pillow created the position of Director of Preservation to direct the activities and maintenance of the Archives. The Archives at Jacob's Pillow has approximately 6,000 films and videos from 1894 to present, 45,000 historic dance photos and negatives, 313,000 pages of unique printed materials, 27 trunks of costumes dating from 1915, and 2,000 books. The Archives is one component of the Pillow's Preservation Program, which organizes exhibits exploring various aspects of dance, oversees issues concerning the National Historic Landmark site, and records the ongoing activities of the Festival.

The archives is internationally recognized as a major repository of dance materials. Access to the research facility is open to the public year-round by appointment and is available during the summer season from noon until the end of each performance, six days a week. The Archives collection is electronically catalogued, and much of it is accessible through the Pillow's website.

Blake's Barn is an 18th-century structure that was relocated and reconfigured specifically for preservation activity. This facility was donated by stage and screen dancer/actress Marge Champion and is named in honor of her late son. In addition to a central area for exhibits and lectures, the building houses a reading room with video stations providing access to the moving image collection. The lower level contains temperature-controlled storage areas and video production equipment.

In 2011, Jacob's Pillow launched Jacob's Pillow Dance Interactive, an online resource of video clips curated from the Archives in Becket. The archive features performances that have taken place at the festival from 1937 to 2010, including footage rarely seen. This user-friendly free resource allows the user to browse dance footage by artist, genre, and era. The Director of Preservation, Norton Owen, curates the collection. Each entry includes a video clip, an informative paragraph describing the dancer/choreographer, and an artist portrait.

See also

 List of National Historic Landmarks in Massachusetts
 National Register of Historic Places listings in Berkshire County, Massachusetts

References

Dance festivals in the United States
National Historic Landmarks in Massachusetts
National Register of Historic Places in Berkshire County, Massachusetts
United States National Medal of Arts recipients
Dance schools in the United States
Dance research
Dance events
Contemporary dance
Dance in Massachusetts
Tourist attractions in Berkshire County, Massachusetts
Historic districts on the National Register of Historic Places in Massachusetts
Event venues on the National Register of Historic Places in Massachusetts